Adelaide High School is a coeducational state high school situated on the corner of West Terrace and Glover Avenue in the Adelaide Parklands. Following the Advanced School for Girls, it was the second government high school in South Australia and the first coeducational public high school in that state. It currently has an enrolment of approximately 1,500 students.

History
In 1879, John Anderson Hartley, Director of Education, established the Advanced School for Girls in Grote Street, Adelaide. It was the first public high school in Australia, those in New South Wales following in the 1880s. Adelaide High was first named the Continuation School, but in April 1908 was renamed Adelaide High School. This was the same year the South Australian state high school system was launched.  The new school combined previous institutions: the Advanced School and the Pupil Teachers School. It also collected bursary holders, and continuation students from the Grote Street Model School. Adelaide High School was officially opened on 24 September 1908 by the premier of South Australia, Thomas Price. It was the first public secondary school in the Commonwealth of Australia.

In 1927, it had an enrolment of 1,067 students, making it the largest school of its kind in the Commonwealth. By 1929, due to increasing enrolments, the school occupied two sites; one site was at Grote Street and the other was at Currie Street (now part of the Remand Centre). Due to the increasing enrolments, it was decided that a new building was required for Adelaide High School. The current site of the school on West Terrace was originally set aside for an army barracks in 1849, but in 1859 an observatory was built instead, which then became the Bureau of Meteorology in 1939.

Based on an award-winning 1940 design, a new building was erected on the site from 1947 to 1951. This became Adelaide Boys High School while Adelaide Girls High School remained in the buildings in Grote Street. An application was made to have the building listed as a Historic Building on the Australian Register of the National Estate. The nomination was on the basis of the building's "Art Modern" style and significance in Adelaide education. It had not led to the building's listing on the register as of 2007. The original Grote Street school buildings were listed on the register as a Historic site in 1980. As of 2007, the buildings were used as a centre for the performing arts. The buildings were considered to be among the Nationally Significant 20th-Century Buildings in South Australia.

In 1977, due to decreasing enrolments at both the Boys and the Girls schools, amalgamation began with Adelaide High School operating on two campuses – one on Grote Street and one on West Terrace. This arrangement ended in 1979, when all students were on the West Terrace site. In 1979, Adelaide High School became South Australia's Special Interest Language School, with students able to study up to seven languages: French, German, Latin, Modern Greek, Chinese, Spanish and Italian. Latin ceased to be offered in 2004 and was replaced by Japanese. Auslan was added as the eighth language in 2018.

In 2008, Adelaide High School celebrated its centenary 100th birthday.

Adelaide is part of the longest-running sporting exchanges with Melbourne High School and Mac.Robertson Girls' High School, both in Melbourne.

Curriculum

Languages 
Adelaide High School is especially known for being a Special Interest Language School, offering students outside the zone to enrol through one of the three Special Entry Programs (Languages. Cricket and Rowing). It offers its students eight different languages to study:

 Modern Greek 
 Mandarin Chinese
 Japanese
 Italian
 French
 Spanish 
 German
 Auslan 

The school is also a Centre for the Hearing Impaired and an Associate School for Students of High Intellectual Potential. It has a Special Entry Program in its special interest cricket and rowing programs.

Adelaide High School is South Australia's only Special Interest Language School, and currently has sister schools around the world, including:

 Asahi High School in Osaka, Japan
 Heriburg Gymnasium in Coesfeld, Nord Rhein Westfalen, Germany
 Lycée Saint Sauveur in Redon, Brittany, France
 IIS Quintino Sella in Biella, Italy
 IES La Sisla in Sonsecas, Spain
 Jinan Foreign Language School in Jinan, China
 Qingdao No 9 School in Qingdao, China
 7th High School of Corfu, Greece

Facilities
Facilities that students have access to include a library, gymnasium, tennis, basketball and netball courts, cricket nets, four ovals (shared with the Adelaide City Council), Performing Arts Centre, science labs and lecture theatres. The school also has a boatshed on the bank of the River Torrens which holds the school's many rowing boats and where the school's rowing crews train. It also has a shared rowing facility at West Lakes with Unley High School and Norwood Morialta High School. A new wing, the Charles Todd Wing, was added to the southern side of the school in 2015. Building 4, previously housing the Languages, Art and Library areas, was upgraded and now contains the Languages, Maths and Arts learning areas. In 2019, the school self-funded a Performing Arts Centre Refurbishment and in 2021, also saw a $24 million build in the centre of the school, in order to accommodate for the large intake of Year 7 students into the school.

Sport

Houses and Special Sport Programs 
The school has four "houses" which students represent in sporting and other events within the school. The houses took their names from past principals of the school. The house names are: Adey (Red), Macghey (Blue), Morriss (Green), and West (Yellow). Sporting events include the intra-House Swimming Carnival and Athletics Carnival. The houses compete for the SJ Dowdy Cup, named after former Principal Stephen Dowdy.

Adelaide High School has a range of girls' and boys' sporting teams and offers Special Interest Sporting Programs including cricket and rowing. The Adelaide High School Cricket Program provides the opportunity for talented cricketers from outside the school zone to enrol at the school, similar to the Adelaide High School Rowing Club, which incorporates a talent identification selection process whereby students from outside the school zone can apply to enrol at the school.

Both Special Entry Programs participate in games and regattas throughout the year which lead up to the main events. The 5 Highs Cricket Carnival is held in December against Melbourne High School, Sydney Boys High School, Brisbane State High School and Kent Street Senior High School. The major rowing event is the Head of the River Regatta held in March or April. This regatta was jointly founded in 1922 by Adelaide High School and St Peter's College. Other sporting trips have the volleyball teams travelling to the Australian Volleyball Schools Cup in Melbourne, in December.

Exchanges 
Since 1913, Adelaide High has taken part in a sporting exchange with Mac.Robertson Girls' High School and since 1910, Melbourne High School. This is the longest-running sporting exchange in the state. Both Exchanges compete for the Prefects' Cup. The exchanges are held in early Term 3 and each year the venue swaps. There are competitions in many sports such as: Australian rules football, soccer, tennis, rowing, basketball, netball, softball, chess, debating, theatre sports, volleyball, cross country /athletics, badminton, table tennis and hockey. Sports previously played against Melbourne included lacrosse, baseball and field hockey.

Adelaide High School is a member of the Sports Association for Adelaide Schools (SAAS).

Head Master / Principal

Notable staff and students
Sir Don Anderson (1917–1975) – Director-General of the Department of Civil Aviation
Lynn Arnold (b. 1949) – South Australian Premier
Nick Bolkus (b. 1950) – South Australian Senator and Cabinet Minister
Shaun Burgoyne (b. 1982) – AFL footballer
Ralph Clarke (b. 1951) – South Australian Deputy Opposition Leader
Hugh Cairns (1896–1952) – First Nuffield Professor of Surgery, Oxford University
John Stuart Dowie (1915–2008) – Artist
Sia (b. 1975) – Pop singer and songwriter
Anne Haddy (1930–1999) – Actress (best known for her role as Helen Daniels in Neighbours)
Barbara Hall (b. circa 1931) – Physicist in 1956. one of two women first to receive a PhD from the University of Adelaide; mother of Hugh Possingham
Bob Hank (1923–2012) – Dual Magarey Medallist
Margaret Hubbard (b. 1924) – First woman to win the Hentford Scholarship for Latin at Oxford 
Tom Koutsantonis (b. 1971) – South Australian Treasurer
Simon Lewicki aka Groove Terminator – Electronic music artist
Brian Ross Martin (b. 1947) – Chief Justice of the Northern Territory
Sir Mark Oliphant (1901–2000) – South Australian Governor
Neil Page (b. 1944) – Australian baseball representative/player
Greig Pickhaver – aka H.G. Nelson, actor, comedian and writer
Chris Sumner (b. 1943) – South Australian Attorney-General
David Vigor (1939–1998) – South Australian Senator
Lou Vincent (b. 1978) – New Zealand Test cricketer
Brennan Cox (b. 1998) – AFL footballer
Oswald Rishbeth (1886-1946) - Geographer, taught at Adelaide High in 1910
Riley Thilthorpe (b. 2002) - AFL Footballer

Further reading

 Adelaide High School Council (1983). Adelaide High School: 75th anniversary, 1908–1983 souvenir book. .

References

External links
Virtual Tour:

Educational institutions established in 1908
Public schools in South Australia
Special interest high schools in South Australia
Secondary schools in Adelaide
1908 establishments in Australia
Adelaide Park Lands